Tanoto Foundation is an independent family philanthropy organisation founded by Indonesian entrepreneur Sukanto Tanoto and his wife Tinah Bingei Tanoto in 1981 The foundation focuses on improving access to knowledge and education, with a specific focus on countries in which Tanoto has business presence, including Indonesia, Singapore and China Key activities include providing access to education through the provision of more than 20,000 scholarships (as of 2018), improving the quality of schools and teaching, and funding medical research into diseases prevalent in Asian populations

History
Sukanto Tanoto and his wife Tinah Bingei funded the construction of a kindergarten and elementary school in Besitang, North Sumatra in 1981. Subsequent philanthropic activities were mostly aimed at improving education amenities and infrastructure in impoverished rural areas of Sumatra. Tanoto Foundation was later formally incorporated as a non-profit charitable organisation in 2001, and expanded its operations to include training teachers, improving educational facilities, providing scholarships, and supporting medical research. It is privately funded by the family of Sukanto Tanoto

In 2018 the foundation announced a refreshed strategy including four targets:
 Contribute to the reduction of the stunting rate in Indonesia to below 20% by 2030
 Help Indonesia become one of the five most improved countries in the OECD's Programme for International Student Assessment (PISA) ranking system by 2030
 Catalyse preventive and integrative medical research efforts into Asian prevalent diseases to extend the average health span of Asians by five years, by 2030 
 Support the development of a community of leaders who are making a positive impact on society

Activities in Indonesia
In 2010, Tanoto Foundation launched the Pelita Pendidikan program to improve the quality of rural education in Indonesia. Pelita Pendidikan aimed to improve the quality of teaching, improve the qualification and competency of teachers, and provide adequate facilities in schools In 2018, Pelita Pendidikan was renamed PINTAR, and was expanded to cover schools in urban areas

In Jakarta, Tanoto Foundation opened the Acacia Child-Friendly Integrated Public Space (RPTRA) in 2016. The 2,400 square metre area includes a library, children's playground, gardens and multipurpose facilities to help provide more opportunities for early childhood development

Tanoto Foundation is also a prominent disburser of higher education scholarships in Indonesia, supporting more than 7,500 students as of 2018 at 28 Indonesian universities through its National Championship Scholarship program. In 2018 the program was renamed TELADAN, which means ‘role model’ in Indonesian. Scholarship recipients have their tuition paid, receive a monthly living allowance, and undergo additional leadership training. As part of TELADAN's focus on leadership training, the number of university partners was reduced to nine

In 2016, Tanoto Foundation agreed to fund a pilot project between UNDP Indonesia and the provincial government in Riau to implement the Sustainable Development Goals at a local level

In 2018, Tanoto Foundation was appointed by Filantropi Indonesia as the inaugural leader of the Education Cluster, a newly created voluntary association of philanthropies and government bodies designed to promote partnership to improve the quality of the country's education system

Tanoto Foundation contributed to the emergency response after the 2018 Sulawesi earthquake and tsunami, providing aircraft to help medical teams reach the area, and donating IDR1 billion to provide medicine and other necessities

Activities in Singapore 
In Singapore, Tanoto Foundation's efforts have largely focused on tertiary education scholarship disbursements, education infrastructure development, art and cultural development, and medical research funding.

In 2005, the foundation funded the construction of the Tanoto Library at the INSEAD campus in Singapore.

In 2007, the foundation helped established the Tanoto Foundation Centre for Southeast Asian Arts in Nanyang Academy of Fine Arts.

Tanoto Foundation has offered scholarships to undergraduate students at Singapore Management University, the National University of Singapore's Yong Loo Lin School of Medicine, and Nanyang Technological University since 2001

In 2011, Tanoto Foundation scholars in Singapore launched an annual program called Project Sukacita, in which volunteers travel to the impoverished rural areas of Pangkalan Kerinci in Sumatra to assist with hygiene and nutrition education, spring cleaning and other community related work

The foundation also supports medical research into diseases prevalent in Asian populations through:
 A S$3 million gift in 2014 to SingHealth Duke-NUS to identify new ways of diagnosing, stratifying and testing cardiovascular diseases, thereby allowing early prevention for those who are genetically predisposed to the disease. Out of the S$3 million gift, S$2.5 million was used to set up the Tanoto Foundation Professorship in Cardiovascular Medicine, which was awarded to Professor Stuart Cook The remaining S$500,000 funded the Tanoto Foundation Initiative for Genetics and Stem Cell Research at National Heart Research Institute Singapore (NHRIS)
 The Tanoto Foundation Professorship in Medical Oncology at SingHealth Duke-NUS, awarded to Associate Professor Lim Soon Thye from the Oncology Academic Clinical Programme in 2016. The S$2.5 million gift is intended to advance research in medical oncology
 A $2 million donation in 2017 to support the Viral Research and Experimental Medicine Centre at SingHealth Duke-NUS (ViREMiCS), which uses molecular techniques and other new technology to shorten clinical trials and bring new drugs and vaccines to market more rapidly

Activities in China 
In 2016, Tanoto Foundation donated RMB 100 million to fund talent training initiatives over 10 years between China and countries in the Belt and Road Initiative

Tanoto Foundation has also announced plans to establish 100 parenting centres in rural China by 2025, which will train caregivers in poverty-stricken areas to promote the development of children aged 0–3

Other activities 
In 2013, Tanoto Foundation collaborated with the Wharton School of the University of Pennsylvania to launch the Tanoto Initiative, which aims to encourage collaboration between the Wharton School and academic institutions in the ASEAN region, with a particular focus on Indonesia

References

External links
 Tanoto Foundation Official Website

Foundations based in Indonesia